Maj. John Burrowes Mansion is located in Matawan, Monmouth County, New Jersey, United States. The mansion was built in 1723 and was added to the National Register of Historic Places on September 29, 1972.

See also
National Register of Historic Places listings in Monmouth County, New Jersey

References

Houses on the National Register of Historic Places in New Jersey
Houses completed in 1723
Burroughs, John
National Register of Historic Places in Monmouth County, New Jersey
New Jersey Register of Historic Places
1723 establishments in New Jersey
Matawan, New Jersey